Aliboron bukidnoni is a species of beetle in the family Cerambycidae. It was described by Vives in 2005.

References

Agapanthiini
Beetles described in 2005